Polyceroidea is a taxonomic superfamily of sea slugs, specifically dorid nudibranchs, marine gastropod mollusks in the clade Doridacea.

Families
Families within the superfamily Polyceroidea include:
Family Aegiridae - In Bouchet & Rocroi (2005) this taxon is incorrectly spelled Aegiretidae.
Family Hexabranchidae
Family Okadaiidae
Family Polyceridae

References

Nudipleura